Mataje is a village in Tumaco Municipality, Nariño Department in Colombia at the border with Ecuador.

Climate
Mataje has a wet tropical rainforest climate (Af).

References

Populated places in the Nariño Department